John Wilson Stewart (1889 – April 23, 1943) was an American football, basketball, and track coach, college athletics administrator, and educator. He served as the head football coach at the University of South Dakota from 1918 to 1919, and the University of Montana from 1922 to 1923, compiling a career college football coaching record of 10–16.  Stewart was the head basketball coach at South Dakota from 1918 to 1922 and Montana from 1922 and 1932, tallying a career college basketball coaching mark of 104–125.  He was also the head track coach at Montana from 1923 to 1925 and the school's athletic director from 1924 to 1932.

Early years
Stewart was a 1911 graduate of Geneva College in Beaver Falls, Pennsylvania. He served as a physical education director at several high schools in South Dakota and Iowa spanning 1911 to 1918.

South Dakota
Stewart served as the head football coach (1918–1919) and head men's basketball coach (1918–1922) at the University of South Dakota.

Montana
Stewart  served as the head football coach (1922–1923), head men's basketball coach (1922–1932), head track coach (1923–1925), and athletic director at the University of Montana.

Death
Stewart died on April 23, 1943, of a heart attack, in Missoula, Montana.

Head coaching record

Football

References

External links
 

1889 births
1943 deaths
Basketball coaches from Ohio
Montana Grizzlies and Lady Griz athletic directors
Montana Grizzlies football coaches
Montana Grizzlies basketball coaches
Montana Grizzlies and Lady Griz track and field coaches
South Dakota Coyotes football coaches
South Dakota Coyotes men's basketball coaches
Geneva College alumni
People from New Concord, Ohio